Thiophene is a heterocyclic compound with the formula C4H4S. Consisting of a planar five-membered ring, it is aromatic as indicated by its extensive substitution reactions. It is a colorless liquid with a benzene-like odor.  In most of its reactions, it resembles benzene. Compounds analogous to thiophene include furan (C4H4O), selenophene (C4H4Se) and pyrrole (C4H4NH), which each vary by the heteroatom in the ring.

Isolation and occurrence
Thiophene was discovered as a contaminant in benzene.  It was observed that isatin (an indole) forms a blue dye if it is mixed with sulfuric acid and crude benzene. The formation of the blue indophenin had long been believed to be a reaction of benzene itself. Viktor Meyer was able to isolate thiophene as the actual substance responsible for this reaction.

Thiophene and especially its derivatives occur in petroleum, sometimes in concentrations up to 1–3%. The thiophenic content of oil and coal is removed via the hydrodesulfurization (HDS) process. In HDS, the liquid or gaseous feed is passed over a form of molybdenum disulfide catalyst under a pressure of H2. Thiophenes undergo hydrogenolysis to form hydrocarbons and hydrogen sulfide.  Thus, thiophene itself is converted to butane and H2S.  More prevalent and more problematic in petroleum are benzothiophene and dibenzothiophene.

On Mars
Thiophene derivatives have been detected at nanomole levels in 3.5 billions year old Martian soil sediments (Murray Formation, Pahrump Hills) by the rover Curiosity at Gale crater (Mars) between 2012 and 2017. It represents an important milestone for the mission of the Mars Science Laboratory (MSL) in the long and elusive quest of organic matter on the red planet. Heating at high temperature (500° to 820 °C) of lacustrine mudstone samples by the Sample Analysis at Mars (SAM) instrument allowed gas chromatography-mass spectrometry (GC-MS) analyses of the evolved gases and the detection of aromatic and aliphatic molecules including several thiophene compounds. The presence of carbon-sulfur bonds in macromolecules could have contributed to the preservation of organic matter at very long-term. It is estimated that ~ 5 % of organic molecules analysed by the SAM instrument contains organic sulfur. The origin and the mode of formation of these molecules are still unknown whether biotic or abiotic, but their discovery put forward the puzzling question of thiophenic compounds as possible ancient biosignature on Mars. Detailed analyses of carbon isotopes (δ13C) at trace level by a next generation of Martian rovers, such as Rosalind Franklin, will be necessary to determine if such organic molecules are enriched in light carbon (12C) as living micro-organisms usually are on Earth.

Synthesis and production
Reflecting their high stabilities, thiophenes arise from many reactions involving sulfur sources and hydrocarbons, especially unsaturated ones.  The first synthesis of thiophene by Meyer, reported the same year that he made his discovery, involves acetylene and elemental sulfur. Thiophenes are classically prepared by the reaction of 1,4-diketones, diesters, or dicarboxylates with sulfidizing reagents such as P4S10 such as in the Paal-Knorr thiophene synthesis.  Specialized thiophenes can be synthesized similarly using Lawesson's reagent as the sulfidizing agent, or via the Gewald reaction, which involves the condensation of two esters in the presence of elemental sulfur. Another method is the Volhard–Erdmann cyclization.

Thiophene is produced on a modest scale of around 2,000 metric tons per year worldwide. Production involves the vapor phase reaction of a sulfur source, typically carbon disulfide, and a C-4 source, typically butanol.  These reagents are contacted with an oxide catalyst at 500–550 °C.

Properties and structure
At room temperature, thiophene is a colorless liquid  with which thiophene shares some similarities.  The high reactivity of thiophene toward sulfonation is the basis for the separation of thiophene from benzene, which are difficult to separate by distillation due to their similar boiling points (4 °C difference at ambient pressure).  Like benzene, thiophene forms an azeotrope with ethanol.

The molecule is flat; the bond angle at the sulfur is around 93°, the C–C–S angle is around 109°, and the other two carbons have a bond angle around 114°. The C–C bonds to the carbons adjacent to the sulfur are about 1.34 Å, the C–S bond length is around 1.70 Å, and the other C–C bond is about 1.41 Å.

Reactivity
Thiophene is considered to be aromatic, although theoretical calculations suggest that the degree of aromaticity is less than that of benzene. The "electron pairs" on sulfur are significantly delocalized in the pi electron system.  As a consequence of its aromaticity, thiophene does not exhibit the properties seen for conventional sulfides.  For example, the sulfur atom resists alkylation and oxidation.

Oxidation
Oxidation can occur both at sulfur, giving a thiophene S-oxide, as well as at the 2,3-double bond, giving the thiophene 2,3-epoxide, followed by subsequent NIH shift rearrangement.  Oxidation of thiophene by trifluoroperacetic acid also demonstrates both reaction pathways.  The major pathway forms the S-oxide as an intermediate, which undergoes subsequent Diels-Alder-type dimerisation and further oxidation, forming a mixture of sulfoxide and sulfone products with a combined yield of 83% (based on NMR evidence):

In the minor reaction pathway, a Prilezhaev epoxidation results in the formation of thiophene-2,3-epoxide that rapidly rearranges to the isomer thiophene-2-one.  Trapping experiments demonstrate that this pathway is not a side reaction from the S-oxide intermediate, while isotopic labeling with deuterium confirm that a 1,2-hydride shift occurs and thus that a cationic intermediate is involved.  If the reaction mixture is not anhydrous, this minor reaction pathway is suppressed as water acts as a competing base.

Oxidation of thiophenes may be relevant to the metabolic activation of various thiophene-containing drugs, such as tienilic acid and the investigational anticancer drug OSI-930.

Alkylation
Although the sulfur atom is relatively unreactive, the flanking carbon centers, the 2- and 5-positions, are highly susceptible to attack by electrophiles.  Halogens give initially 2-halo derivatives followed by 2,5-dihalothiophenes; perhalogenation is easily accomplished to give C4X4S (X = Cl, Br, I).  Thiophene brominates 107 times faster than does benzene.  Acetylation occurs readily to give 2-acetylthiophene, precursor to thiophene-2-carboxylic acid and thiophene-2-acetic acid.

Chloromethylation and chloroethylation occur readily at the 2,5-positions.  Reduction of the chloromethyl product gives 2-methylthiophene.  Hydrolysis followed by dehydration of the chloroethyl species gives 2-vinylthiophene.

Desulfurization by Raney nickel
Desulfurization of thiophene with Raney nickel affords butane. When coupled with the easy 2,5-difunctionalization of thiophene, desulfurization provides a  route to 1,4-disubstituted butanes.

Polymerization
The polymer formed by linking thiophene through its 2,5 positions is called polythiophene.  Polymerization is conducted by oxidation using electrochemical methods (electropolymerization) or electron-transfer reagents.  An idealized equation is shown:
n C4H4S   →   (C4H2S)n  +  2n H+  +  2n e−

Polythiophene itself has poor processing properties and so is little studied.  More useful are polymers derived from thiophenes substituted at the 3- and 3- and 4- positions, such as EDOT (ethylenedioxythiophene).  Polythiophenes become electrically conductive upon partial oxidation, i.e. they obtain some of the characteristics typically observed in metals.

Coordination chemistry
Thiophene exhibits little sulfide-like character, but it does serve as a pi-ligand forming piano stool complexes such as Cr(η5-C4H4S)(CO)3.

Thiophene derivatives

Thienyl
Upon deprotonation, thiophene converts to the thienyl group, C4H3S−. Although the anion per se does not exist, the organolithium derivatives do.  Thus reaction of thiophene with butyl lithium gives 2-lithiothiophene, also called 2-thienyllithium.  This reagent reacts with electrophiles to give thienyl derivatives, such as the thiol.  Oxidation of thienyllithium gives 2,2'-dithienyl, (C4H3S)2.  Thienyl lithium is employed in the preparation of higher order mixed cuprates.  Coupling of thienyl anion equivalents gives dithienyl, an analogue of biphenyl.

Ring-fused thiophenes
Fusion of thiophene with a benzene ring gives benzothiophene.  Fusion with two benzene rings gives either dibenzothiophene (DBT) or naphthothiophene.  Fusion of a pair of thiophene rings gives isomers of thienothiophene.

Uses
Thiophenes are important heterocyclic compounds that are widely used as building blocks in many agrochemicals and pharmaceuticals.  The benzene ring of a biologically active compound may often be replaced by a thiophene without loss of activity. This is seen in examples such as the NSAID lornoxicam, the thiophene analog of piroxicam, and sufentanil, the thiophene analog of fentanyl.

References

External links
International Chemical Safety Card 1190

 
Simple aromatic rings